Diego Piece is a settlement in Grenada.  It is located at the northern end of the island, in the Parish of Saint mark.

References 

Populated places in Grenada